Liechtenstein competed at the 2014 Summer Youth Olympics, in Nanjing, China from 16 August to 28 August 2014.

Swimming

Liechtenstein qualified one swimmer.

Girls

References

2014 in Liechtenstein sport
Nations at the 2014 Summer Youth Olympics
Liechtenstein at the Youth Olympics